This is a comprehensive list of victories of the  cycling team. The races are categorized according to the UCI Continental Circuits rules.

1984 – Kwantum–Decosol

Criterium Woerden, Joop Zoetemelk
Criterium Roosendaal, Adri van der Poel
Acht van Chaam, Jacques Hanegraaf
Ronde van Boxmeer, Ad Wijnands
Profronde van Made, Jacques Hanegraaf
Nacht van Peer, Ludo Peeters
Profronde van Surhuisterveen, Joop Zoetemelk
Draai van de Kaai, Adri van der Poel
 Road Race Championship, Jan Raas
Amstel Gold Race, Jacques Hanegraaf
Criterium Hansweert, Leo van Vliet
Criterium Ulvenhout, Jan Raas
Criterium Kwadendamme, Jan Raas
Criterium Venhuizen, Joop Zoetemelk
Scheldeprijs Vlaanderen, Ludo Peeters
Criterium Helden-Panningen, Ad Wijnands
Criterium Linne, Jan Raas
Ronde van Kortenhoef, Leo van Vliet
Criterium Echt, Hennie Kuiper
Criterium Ede, Jacques Hanegraaf
Criterium Dongen, Leo van Vliet
GP Raymond Impanis, Ad Wijnands
G.P Impanis, Ad Wijnands

1985 – Kwantum–Decosol

Ronde van Friesland, Jacques Hanegraaf
Criterium Roosendaal, Joop Zoetemelk
Profronde van Oostvoorne, Joop Zoetemelk
Züri Metzgete, Ludo Peeters
Overall Tour de Luxembourg, Jelle Nijdam
Profronde van Surhuisterveen, Gerrit Solleveld
Draai van de Kaai, Joop Zoetemelk
Wateringse Wielerdag, Maarten Ducrot
Overall Tour of Belgium, Ludo Peeters
Profronde van Made, Ludo Peeters
Binche-Tournai-Binche, Adri van der Poel
Overall Tirreno – Adriatico, Joop Zoetemelk
Stage 5, Joop Zoetemelk
Brabantse Pijl, Adri van der Poel
Criterium Wouw, Adri van der Poel
 Road Race Championship, Jacques Hanegraaf
Stage 4 Tour de France, Gerrit Solleveld
Stage 5 Tour de France, Henri Manders
Stage 9 Tour de France, Maarten Ducrot
Criterium Kloosterzande, Jelle Nijdam
Criterium Venhuizen, Adri van der Poel
Scheldeprijs Vlaanderen, Adri van der Poel
Clásica Ciclista San Sebastián, Adri van der Poel
Dutch Food Valley Classic, Joop Zoetemelk
 World Road Race Championship, Joop Zoetemelk
GP d´Isbergues, Adri van der Poel
Paris – Bruxelles, Adri van der Poel
G.P Impanis, Jelle Nijdam
GP Raymond Impanis, Jelle Nijdam
Paris – Tours, Ludo Peeters

1986 – Kwantum–Decosol

Nationale Sluitingprijs – Putte-Kapellen, Adri van der Poel
Delta Profronde, Gerrit Solleveld
Acht van Chaam, Adri van der Poel
Overall Tour of Belgium, Nico Emonds
Mijl van Mares, Toine Poels
Ronde van Pijnacker, Gerrit Solleveld
Profronde van Made, Adri van der Poel
Tour of Flanders, Adri van der Poel
Criterium Bavel, Adri van der Poel
Criterium Hansweert, Ad Wijnands
Criterium Apeldoorn, Joop Zoetemelk
Stage 1 Critérium du Dauphiné, Hans Daams
Stage 4b Critérium du Dauphiné, Luc Roosen
Stage 7a Critérium du Dauphiné, Maarten Ducrot
Stage 7 Tour de France, Ludo Peeters

1987 – Superconfex–Yoko

Criterium Woerden, Joop Zoetemelk
Profronde van Oostvoorne, Jelle Nijdam
Nacht van Hengelo, Rolf Gölz
Overall Tour du Haut Var, Rolf Gölz
Delta Profronde, Jean-Paul van Poppel
Züri Metzgete, Rolf Gölz
Overall Tour Méditerranéen, Gerrit Solleveld
Overall Tour de Picardie, Jelle Nijdam
Profronde van Surhuisterveen, Joop Zoetemelk
Vuelta a Andalucía – Ruta Ciclista del Sol, Rolf Gölz
Kuurne–Bruxelles–Kuurne, Ludo Peeters
Dwars door Vlaanderen, Jelle Nijdam
Brabantse Pijl, Edwig Van Hooydonck
Amstel Gold Race, Joop Zoetemelk
Criterium Apeldoorn, Jelle Nijdam
Criterium Kloosterzande, Edwig Van Hooydonck
Criterium Hansweert, Cees Priem
Prologue Tour de France, Jelle Nijdam
Stage 1  Tour de France, Nico Verhoeven
Stages 8 & 17  Tour de France, Edwig Van Hooydonck
Stage 15  Tour de France, Rolf Gölz
Criterium Helden-Panningen, Jean-Paul van Poppel
Criterium Simpelveld, Jelle Nijdam
Criterium Tiel, Nico Verhoeven
Criterium Kamerik, Maarten Ducrot
GP Stad Zottegem, Nico Verhoeven

1988 – Superconfex–Yoko

GP Eddy Merckx, Edwig Van Hooydonck
Circuit de la vallée de la Lys, Jacques Hanegraaf
GP d'Ouverture La Marseillaise, Ad Wijnands
Vuelta Ciclista Asturias, Rolf Gölz
Wateringse Wielerdag, Gerrit Solleveld
Tour of Belgium, Frans Maassen
Vuelta a Andalucía – Ruta Ciclista Del Sol, Edwig Van Hooydonck
Profronde van Made, Jacques Hanegraaf
Profronde van Surhuisterveen, Jelle Nijdam
La Flèche Wallonne, Rolf Gölz
Amstel Gold Race, Jelle Nijdam
Scheldeprijs Vlaanderen, Jean-Paul van Poppel
Stage 4a Tour de Romandie, Frans Maassen
Binche-Tournai-Binche, Nico Emonds
Stage 6a Critérium du Dauphiné, Frans Maassen
Stages 3, 10, 17 & 22 Tour de France, Jean-Paul van Poppel
Stage 5 Tour de France, Jelle Nijdam
Stage 8 Tour de France, Rolf Gölz
Criterium Simpelveld, Jean-Paul van Poppel
GP Kanton Aargau, Arjan Jagt
Criterium Linne, Frans Maassen
Criterium Valkenswaard, Jean-Paul van Poppel
Dutch Food Valley Classic, Ronny Vlasskas
Paris – Bruxelles, Rolf Gölz
Milano–Torino, Rolf Gölz
Giro del Piemonte, Rolf Gölz

1989 – Superconfex–Yoko

Profronde van Oostvoorne, Jelle Nijdam
Delta Profronde, Jelle Nijdam
Acht van Chaam, Jelle Nijdam
Ronde van Boxmeer, Frans Maassen
Profronde van Made, Nico Verhoeven
Kuurne–Bruxelles–Kuurne, Edwig Van Hooydonck
Stage 5 Tirreno – Adriatico, Rolf Gölz
Kuurne–Bruxelles–Kuurne, Edwig Van Hooydonck
Tour of Flanders, Edwig Van Hooydonck
Gent–Wevelgem, Gerrit Solleveld
GP de Denain Porte du Hainaut, Edwig Van Hooydonck
Criterium Apeldoorn, Gerrit Solleveld
 Road Race Championship, Frans Maassen
Stage 4 & 14 Tour de France, Jelle Nijdam
Wincanton Classic, Frans Maassen
Criterium Heerhugowaard, Gert Jakobs
Criterium Helden-Panningen, Frans Maassen
GP Stad Zottegem, Gino Van Hooydonck
Paris–Bruxelles, Jelle Nijdam
Paris–Tours, Jelle Nijdam
Milano–Torino, Rolf Gölz

1990 – Buckler–Colnago

GP Eddy Merckx, Frans Maassen
Ronde van Nederland, Jelle Nijdam
Criterium Woerden, Jelle Nijdam
Rund um Köln, Noël Segers
Étoile de Bessèges, Frans Maassen
Vuelta Ciclista a Murcia – Costa Calida, Tom Cordes
Profronde van Heerlen, Peter Winnen
Acht van Chaam, Gerrit Solleveld
Profronde van Stiphout, Frans Maassen
Overall Tour of Belgium, Frans Maassen
Mijl van Mares, Frans Maassen
Gouden Pijl Emmen, Jelle Nijdam
Volta a la Comunidad Valenciana, Tom Cordes
Trofeo Luis Puig, Tom Cordes
Stage 5 Tirreno – Adriatico, Eric Vanderaerden
Dwars door Vlaanderen, Edwig Van Hooydonck
Brabantse Pijl, Frans Maassen
Binche-Tournai-Binche, Jelle Nijdam
Delta Profronde, Gerrit Solleveld
Stage 1 Critérium du Dauphiné, Rolf Gölz
 Road Race Championship, Peter Winnen
Stage 1 Tour de France, Frans Maassen
Stage 5 Tour de France, Gerrit Solleveld
Stage 6 Tour de France, Jelle Nijdam
Criterium Heerhugowaard, Gerrit de Vries
GP Stad Zottegem, Marco van der Hulst
Dutch Food Valley Classic, Wiebren Veenstra
GP Raymond Impanis, Wiebren Veenstra
G.P Impanis, Wiebren Veenstra
GP de Fourmies / La Voix du Nord, Frans Maassen

1991 – Buckler–Colnago

Ronde van Nederland, Frans Maassen
Criterium Woerden, Frans Maassen
Profronde van Oostvoorne, Steven Rooks
KBC Driedaagse van De Panne – Koksijde, Jelle Nijdam
GP d'Ouverture La Marseillaise, Edwig Van Hooydonck
Profronde van Made, Edwig Van Hooydonck
Profronde van Surhuisterveen, Wiebren Veenstra
Profronde van Heerlen, Frans Maassen
Nacht van Peer, Eric Vanderaerden
Delta Profronde, Wiebren Veenstra
Dwars door Vlaanderen, Eric Vanderaerden
Brabantse Pijl, Edwig Van Hooydonck
Tour of Flanders, Edwig Van Hooydonck
Amstel Gold Race, Frans Maassen
 Road Race Championship, Steven Rooks
Stage 5 Tour de France, Jelle Nijdam
Criterium Helden-Panningen, Jelle Nijdam
Dutch Food Valley Classic, Wiebren Veenstra
Criterium Valkenswaard, Steven Rooks
Schaal Sels – Merksem, Edwig Van Hooydonck
GP Raymond Impanis, Wiebren Veenstra
GP Impanis, Wiebren Veenstra
GP Jef Scherens Leuven, Wiklo Zuijderwijk

1992 – Buckler–Colnago

GP Eddy Merckx, Jelle Nijdam
Ronde van Nederland, Jelle Nijdam
KBC Driedaagse van De Panne – Koksijde, Frans Maassen
GP d'Ouverture La Marseillaise, Edwig Van Hooydonck
Ronde van Pijnacker, Jelle Nijdam
GP de Denain Porte du Hainaut, Edwig Van Hooydonck
Stage 1 Vuelta a España, Jelle Nijdam
Stage 6 Vuelta a España, Edwig Van Hooydonck
Stage 17 Vuelta a España, Eric Vanderaerden

1993 – Wordperfect 

Omloop van het Houtland Lichtervelde, Danny Daelman
KBC Driedaagse van De Panne – Koksijde, Eric Vanderaerden
Tour de Picardie, Frédéric Moncassin
Gouden Pijl Emmen, Frans Maassen
Brabantse Pijl, Edwig Van Hooydonck
Stage 2 Tour de Romandie, Edwig Van Hooydonck
Prologue & Stage 3 Critérium du Dauphiné, Raúl Alcalá
Stage 1 Critérium du Dauphiné, Frédéric Moncassin
Dutch Food Valley Classic, Rob Mulders
GP Jef Scherens Leuven, Frans Maassen
Kampioenschap van Vlaanderen, Sammie Moreels

1994 – Wordperfect 

Overall Tour of Sweden, Erik Dekker
Halle–Ingooigem, Eric Van Lancker
Volta a la Comunidad Valenciana, Viatcheslav Ekimov
Profronde van Surhuisterveen, Erik Dekker
Overall Tour de Luxembourg, Frans Maassen
Stage 1 Vuelta Ciclista al Pais Vasco, Erik Dekker
Dutch Food Valley Classic, Viatcheslav Ekimov
Overall Tour DuPont, Viatcheslav Ekimov
Criterium Helden-Panningen, Rob Mulders
GP Stad Zottegem, Marc Wauters
Kampioenschap van Vlaanderen, Jelle Nijdam

1995 – Novell 

GP Herning, Frédéric Moncassin
Klauterkoers Sweikhuisen, Erik Dekker
Overall Tour of Sweden, Erik Dekker
Profronde van Heerlen, Frans Maassen
Kuurne–Bruxelles–Kuurne, Frédéric Moncassin
Brabantse Pijl, Edwig Van Hooydonck
Rund um Köln, Erik Dekker
Stage 5 Tour de Suisse, Viatcheslav Ekimov
Stage 20 Tour de France, Djamolidine Abdoujaparov
GP Jef Scherens Leuven, Erik Dekker

1996 – Rabobank 

Profronde van Almelo, Erik Dekker
Dokkum Woudenomloop, Koos Moerenhout
Ronde van Nederland, Rolf Sørensen
Overall Tour of Sweden, Michael Blaudzun
Nacht van Hengelo, Léon van Bon
Overall KBC Driedaagse van De Panne – Koksijde, Viatcheslav Ekimov
Nacht van Peer, Johan Bruyneel
Circuit Franco-Belge, Koos Moerenhout
Kuurne–Bruxelles–Kuurne, Rolf Sørensen
Stage 1 Tirreno–Adriatico, Léon van Bon
Stage 7 Tirreno–Adriatico, Rolf Sørensen
Klauterkoers Sweikhuisen, Michael Boogerd
 Time Trial Championship, Erik Dekker
Stage 6 Tour de France, Michael Boogerd
Stage 13 Tour de France, Rolf Sørensen
Profronde van Stiphout, Michael Boogerd
Wateringse Wielerdag, Michael Boogerd
Mijl van Mares, Michael Boogerd
Drielandenomloop, Danny Nelissen
Druivenkoers – Overijse, Erik Breukink

1997 – Rabobank

Ronde van Nederland, Erik Dekker
Profronde van Oostvoorne, Erik Breukink
Klauterkoers Sweikhuisen, Erik Dekker
Amsterdam Derny Race, Léon van Bon
Profronde van Stiphout, Erik Dekker
Acht van Chaam, Adri van der Poel
Profronde van Made, Léon van Bon
Profronde van Heerlen, Michael Boogerd
Route du Sud, Patrick Jonker
Jayco Bay Cycling Classic, Robbie McEwen
Prologue Tirreno – Adriatico, Rolf Sørensen
Stage 3b KBC Driedaagse van De Panne – Koksijde, Rolf Sørensen
Tour of Flanders, Rolf Sørensen
 Time Trial Championship, Erik Breukink
Stage 18 Vuelta a España, Léon van Bon
Stage 22 Vuelta a España, Max van Heeswijk

1998 – Rabobank

Ronde van Nederland, Rolf Sørensen
Criterium Roosendaal, Michael Boogerd
Profronde van Oostvoorne, Koos Moerenhout
Profronde van Almelo, Robbie McEwen
Amsterdam Derny Race, Maarten den Bakker
Trofeo Calvià, Léon van Bon
Profronde van Heerlen, Max van Heeswijk
Wateringse Wielerdag, Max van Heeswijk
Ronde van Boxmeer, Michael Boogerd
Profronde van Made, Michael Boogerd
Trofeo Palma, Léon van Bon
Overall Tour of Austria, Beat Zberg
Stage 5 Tirreno – Adriatico, Rolf Sørensen
Overall Setmana Catalana de Ciclisme, Michael Boogerd
Stage 3, Michael Boogerd
Stage 9 Tour de France, Léon van Bon
 Road Race Championship, Michael Boogerd
 Time Trial Championship Beat Zberg
Vattenfall Cyclassics, Léon van Bon
 Time Trial Championship, Patrick Jonker

1999 – Rabobank

Nacht van Hengelo, Erik Dekker
Amsterdam Derny Race, Michael Boogerd
Profronde van Almelo, Maarten den Bakker
Wateringse Wielerdag, Marc Lotz
Acht van Chaam, Michael Boogerd
Mijl van Mares, Robbie McEwen
Rothaus Regio-Tour International, Grischa Niermann
Rheinland-Pfalz Rundfahrt, Marc Wauters
GP Eddy Merckx, Marc Wauters
Jayco Bay Cycling Classic, Robbie McEwen
Stage 3 Volta a la Comunidad Valenciana, Michael Boogerd
Stage 5a Vuelta Ciclista al Pais Vasco, Michael Boogerd
Stage 5b Vuelta Ciclista al Pais Vasco, Koos Moerenhout
Overall Paris – Nice, Michael Boogerd
Amstel Gold Race, Michael Boogerd
GP de Wallonie, Patrick Jonker
Overall Tour de Luxembourg, Marc Wauters
 Road Race Championship, Maarten den Bakker
Stage 20 Tour de France, Robbie McEwen
Stage 1 Tour of Denmark, Rolf Sørensen
Giro dell´Emilia, Michael Boogerd
G.P. Beghelli, Michael Boogerd
Paris – Tours, Marc Wauters
Milano–Torino, Markus Zberg

2000 – Rabobank

Nacht van Hengelo, Michael Boogerd
Criterium Bavikhoeve, Erik Dekker
Peperbus Profspektakel Zwolle, Léon van Bon
Gouden Pijl Emmen, Erik Dekker
Profronde van Heerlen, Erik Dekker
Wateringse Wielerdag, Léon van Bon
Ronde van Boxmeer, Erik Dekker
Ronde van Pijnacker, Michael Boogerd
Nacht van Peer, Marc Wauters
Groningen-Münster, Aart Vierhouten
Stage 7 Tirreno – Adriatico, Michael Boogerd
Dutch Food Valley Classic, Steven de Jongh
Stages 1a & 3 Tour of Sweden, Erik Dekker
 Road Race Championship, Léon van Bon
 Road Race Championship, Markus Zberg
Stage 6 Tour de France, Léon van Bon
Stages 8, 11 & 17 Tour de France, Erik Dekker
Overall Tour of Denmark, Rolf Sørensen
Clásica Ciclista San Sebastián, Erik Dekker
 Time Trial Championship, Erik Dekker
Overall Ronde van Nederland, Erik Dekker
Prologue, Erik Dekker
Schaal Sels – Merksem, Steven de Jongh
Delta Profronde, Léon van Bon
Overall Rheinland-Pfalz Rundfahrt, Marc Wauters
Stage 3b, Marc Wauters
Nationale Sluitingprijs – Putte-Kapellen, Steven de Jongh

2001 – Rabobank

Criterium Volendam, Erik Dekker
Trofeo Calvià, Mathew Hayman
Spektakel van Steenwijk, Michael Boogerd
Wateringse Wielerdag, Michael Boogerd
Profronde van Surhuisterveen, Erik Dekker
Trofeo Alcudia, Michael Boogerd
GP Eddy Merckx, Erik Dekker
Vuelta a Andalucía, Erik Dekker
Stages 1 & 4 Volta a la Comunidad Valenciana, Michael Boogerd
Overall Guldensporentweedaagse, Erik Dekker
Stage 1, Erik Dekker
Stage 3 Tirreno – Adriatico, Markus Zberg
Stage 7 Tirreno – Adriatico, Michael Boogerd
Setmana Catalana de Ciclisme, Michael Boogerd
Brabantse Pijl, Michael Boogerd
Dutch Food Valley Classic, Steven de Jongh
Amstel Gold Race, Erik Dekker
Niedersachsen-Rundfahrt, Grischa Niermann
Rund um den Finanzplatz Eschborn–Frankfurt, Markus Zberg
GP Kanton Aargau, Karsten Kroon
Stage 2 Tour de France, Marc Wauters
Stage 8 Tour de France, Erik Dekker
Stage 6 Ronde van Nederland, Erik Dekker
Overall Rheinland-Pfalz Rundfahrt, Erik Dekker
Stage 1, Michael Boogerd
Stage 2, Erik Dekker
Stage 13 Vuelta a España, Beat Zberg

2002 – Rabobank

Criterium Roosendaal, Michael Boogerd
Trofeo Calvià, Erik Dekker
Peperbus Profspektakel Zwolle, Michael Boogerd
Gouden Pijl Emmen, Michael Boogerd
Draai van de Kaai, Michael Boogerd
Spektakel van Steenwijk, Levi Leipheimer
Acht van Chaam, Erik Dekker
Ronde van Boxmeer, Michael Boogerd
Route du Sud, Levi Leipheimer
Amstel Curaçao Race, Michael Boogerd
Stage 5 Vuelta a Andalucía, Erik Dekker
Overall Guldensporentweedaagse, Erik Dekker
Stage 1, Coen Boerman
Stage 3, Erik Dekker
Overall Tirreno – Adriatico, Erik Dekker
Stage 4, Erik Dekker
Stage 1 Vuelta Ciclista al Pais Vasco, Beat Zberg
Dutch Food Valley Classic, Bobbie Traksel
Stages 1b & 2 Tour of Sweden, Steven de Jongh
Stage 8 Tour de France, Karsten Kroon
Stage 16 Tour de France, Michael Boogerd
 Time Trial Championship, Erik Dekker
GP Stad Zottegem, Matthé Pronk
Stage 2 Ronde van Nederland, Steven de Jongh
Stage 6 Ronde van Nederland, Michael Boogerd
Schaal Sels – Merksem, Steven de Jongh
 Time Trial Championship, marc Wauters
Stage 1 Ster Elektrotoer, Bobbie Traksel

2003 – Rabobank

Trofeo Calvià, Remmert Wielinga
Istrian Spring Trophy, Pieter Weening
Giro della Provincia di Lucca, Óscar Freire
Stage 1  Tour Méditerranéen, Bram de Groot
Stages 1 & 2 Vuelta a Andalucía, Óscar Freire
Stage 4 Vuelta a Andalucía, Remmert Wielinga
Kuurne–Bruxelles–Kuurne, Roy Sentjens
G.P Erik Breukink, Erik Dekker
Stage 7 Tirreno–Adriatico, Óscar Freire
Stage 2 Setmana Catalana de Ciclisme, Beat Zberg
E3 Prijs Vlaanderen, Steven de Jongh
Brabantse Pijl, Michael Boogerd
Stage 3a KBC Driedaagse van De Panne – Koksijde, Steven de Jongh
Stage 1 Internationale Thüringen-Rundfahrt U23, Pieter Weening
Stages 2, 4 & 5 Olympia´s Tour, Hans Dekkers
Stage 4 Tour de Luxembourg, Robert Bartko
Stage 2 Volta Ciclista a Catalunya, Bram de Groot
Stage 5 Volta Ciclista a Catalunya, Óscar Freire
 Time Trial Championship, Marc Wauters
 Time Trial Championship, Maarten den Bakker
Schaal Sels – Merksem, Steven de Jongh

2004 – Rabobank

Trofeo Alcudia, Óscar Freire
Le Triptyque des Monts et Châteaux – Frasnes, Thomas Dekker
Amstel Curaçao Race, Óscar Freire
Circuit de Lorraine, Joost Posthuma
Overall Tour of Qatar, Robbie Hunter
Stages 3 & 5, Robbie Hunter
Tour du Haut Var, Marc Lotz
Trofeo Luis Puig, Óscar Freire
Kuurne–Bruxelles–Kuurne, Steven de Jongh
Overall Driedaagse West-Vlaanderen, Robert Bartko
Prologue, Robert Bartko
Stage 3  Tirreno – Adriatico, Óscar Freire
Milano – Sanremo, Óscar Freire
Stage 4 Setmana Catalana de Ciclisme, Levi Leipheimer
Overall Tour de Normandie, Thomas Dekker
Albert Achterhes Profronde van Drenthe, Erik Dekker
Rund um den Finanzplatz Eschborn–Frankfurt, Karsten Kroon
Overall Internationale Thüringen-Rundfahrt U23, Thomas Dekker
Stage 4, Thomas Dekker
Overall Olympia´s Tour, Thomas Dekker
Prologue & Stage 5, Thomas Dekker
 Time Trial Championship, Thomas Dekker
 Road Race Championship, Thomas Dekker
Stage 6 Critérium du Dauphiné, Michael Rasmussen
Stages 3 & 5 Tour de Suisse, Robbie Hunter
Profronde van Heerlen, Marc Lotz
GP Stad Kortrijk, Marc Wauters
Overall Ronde van Nederland, Erik Dekker
Stage 6, Erik Dekker
Stage 6 Vuelta a España, Óscar Freire
Rheinland-Pfalz Rundfahrt, Thomas Dekker
 World Road Championship, Óscar Freire
Paris – Tours, Erik Dekker

2005 – Rabobank

Trofeo Palma de Mallorca, Óscar Freire
Trofeo Alcudia, Óscar Freire
Overall Tirreno – Adriatico, Óscar Freire
Stages 2, 3 & 4, Óscar Freire
Stage 6 Paris – Nice, Joost Posthuma
Nokere Koerse, Steven de Jongh
Brabantse Pijl, Óscar Freire
Stage 2 Critérium International, Thomas Dekker
Scheldeprijs Vlaanderen, Thorwald Veneberg
UNIQA Classic, Bram de Groot
Stage 3 Volta Ciclista a Catalunya, Pedro Horrillo
Nacht van Hengelo, Joost Posthuma
Stage 3 Ster Elektrotoer, Jukka Vastaranta
Stage 3 Tour of Austria, Maarten den Bakker
Stage 8 Tour de France, Pieter Weening
Stage 9 Tour de France, Michael Rasmussen
Overall Sachsen-Tour International, Mathew Hayman
Ronde van Boxmeer, Michael Boogerd
Wateringse Wielerdag, Pieter Weening
Profronde van Heerlen, Michael Rasmussen
Profronde van Surhuisterveen, Pieter Weening
Mijl van Mares, Pieter Weening
 Time Trial Championship, Thomas Dekker
GP Stad Zottegem, Thomas Dekker
Overall Vuelta a España, Denis Menchov
Stages 1 & 9, Denis Menchov
 Time Trial Championship, Marc Wauters
GP Jef Scherens Leuven, Joost Posthuma
Stage 8 Tour de Pologne, Thomas Dekker
Delta Profronde, Bram de Groot

2006 – Rabobank

 Road Race Championships, William Walker
Stage 1 Volta a la Comunidad Valenciana, Alexandr Kolobnev
Overall Tirreno – Adriatico, Thomas Dekker
Stage 3, Óscar Freire
Brabantse Pijl, Óscar Freire
Overall Tour de Normandie, Kai Reus
Prologue & Stage 5, Kai Reus
Stage 1 Critérium International, Erik Dekker
Stage 4 Vuelta Ciclista al Pais Vasco, Óscar Freire
Ronde van Noord-Holland, Kai Reus
Liège – Bastogne – Liège U23, Kai Reus
Nacht van Hengelo, Erik Dekker
Stage 4 Critérium du Dauphiné, Denis Menchov
Stage 2 Ster Elektrotoer, Erik Dekker
Stage 7 Tour de Suisse, Óscar Freire
 Road Race Championships, Michael Boogerd
GP Gerrie Knetemann, Roy Sentjens
Stages 5 & 9 Tour de France, Óscar Freire
Stage 11 Tour de France, Denis Menchov
Stage 16 Tour de France, Michael Rasmussen
Stage 1 Sachsen-Tour International, Pedro Horrillo
Ronde van Boxmeer, Michael Boogerd
Acht van Chaam, Michael Boogerd
Nacht van Peer, Marc Wauters
Wateringse Wielerdag, Óscar Freire
Profronde van Heerlen, Óscar Freire
Vattenfall Cyclassics, Óscar Freire
Draai van de Kaai, Óscar Freire
Ronde van Maastricht, Joost Posthuma
Profronde van Oostvoorne, Michael Boogerd
Stages 4 & 8 Deutschland Tour, Graeme Brown
Peperbus Profspektakel Zwolle, Michael Boogerd
Profronde van Almelo, Joost Posthuma
Tour de Rijke, Graeme Brown

2007 – Rabobank

Trofeo Mallorca, Óscar Freire
Trofeo Pollença, Thomas Dekker
Overall  Vuelta a Andalucía, Óscar Freire
Stage 2 & 5, Óscar Freire
Stage 3, Max van Heeswijk
Stage 1 Tour of California, Graeme Brown
Stage 3 Vuelta a Murcia, Graeme Brown
Nokere Koerse, Léon van Bon
Milan–San Remo, Óscar Freire
Brabantse Pijl, Óscar Freire
Overall  Tour de Romandie, Thomas Dekker
Stage 5, Thomas Dekker
Stage 5 Volta a Catalunya, Denis Menchov
Stage 4 Tour of Belgium, Robert Gesink
Stage 5 Tour de Suisse, Thomas Dekker
Overall Ster Elektrotoer, Sebastian Langeveld
Stages 8 & 17 Tour de France, Michael Rasmussen
Overall Sachsen-Tour International, Joost Posthuma
Stage 4, Joost Posthuma
Stage 5 Danmark Rundt, Rick Flens
Overall  Vuelta a España, Denis Menchov
Stages 2, 5 & 6, Óscar Freire
Stage 10, Denis Menchov
Stage 2 Tour de Pologne, Graeme Brown
Overall 3-Länder-Tour, Thomas Dekker
Stages 2 & 4, Thomas Dekker

2008 – Rabobank

Stage 1 Vuelta a Murcia, Graeme Brown
Stages 1, 4 & 6 Tirreno–Adriatico, Óscar Freire
Stage 1 Critérium International, Laurens ten Dam
Overall Driedaagse van De Panne, Joost Posthuma
Stage 4, Joost Posthuma
Gent–Wevelgem, Óscar Freire
Overall Tour de Luxembourg, Joost Posthuma
Stage 1 Tour de Suisse, Óscar Freire
Points classification  Tour de France, Óscar Freire
Stage 14, Óscar Freire
Stage 11 Vuelta a España, Óscar Freire
Circuit Franco-Belge, Juan Antonio Flecha

2009 – Rabobank

Stage 3 Tour Down Under, Graeme Brown
Overall  Vuelta a Andalucía, Joost Posthuma
Overall Vuelta a Murcia, Denis Menchov
Stages 1 & 5 Graeme Brown
Nokere Koerse, Graeme Brown
Overall Tour of Belgium, Lars Boom
Overall  Giro d'Italia, Denis Menchov
Stages 5, 10 & 12, Denis Menchov
Stage 8 Critérium du Dauphiné Libéré, Stef Clement
Stage 20 Tour de France, Juan Manuel Gárate
Stage 15 Vuelta a España, Lars Boom
Overall Giro dell'Emilia, Robert Gesink

2010 – Rabobank

Trofeo Cala Millor, Óscar Freire
Stages 2 & 3 Vuelta a Andalucía, Óscar Freire
Prologue Paris–Nice, Lars Boom
Milan–San Remo, Óscar Freire
Stage 1 Delta Tour Zeeland, Jos van Emden
Stage 1 Ster Elektrotour, Jos van Emden
Stage 5 Tour of Austria, Nick Nuyens
Stage 7 Tour of Austria, Joost Posthuma
Stage 7 Tour of Austria, Graeme Brown
Grand Prix Cycliste de Montréal, Robert Gesink
Overall Giro dell'Emilia, Robert Gesink
Overall Paris–Tours, Óscar Freire

2011 – Rabobank

Stage 3 Tour Down Under, Michael Matthews
Prologue Tour of Qatar, Lars Boom
Overall  Tour of Oman, Robert Gesink
Stages 1 & 3, Theo Bos
Stages 4 & 5, Robert Gesink
Stages 4 & 5 Vuelta a Andalucía, Óscar Freire
Omloop Het Nieuwsblad, Sebastian Langeveld
Stage 1 Vuelta a Murcia, Michael Matthews
Stage 1 Tirreno–Adriatico, Team Time Trial
Rund um Köln, Michael Matthews
Stage 5 Giro d'Italia, Pieter Weening
Prologue Critérium du Dauphiné, Lars Boom
Tour de Rijke, Theo Bos
Prologue Delta Tour Zeeland, Jos van Emden
Stage 6 Tour de Suisse, Steven Kruijswijk
 Time Trial Championships, Jos van Emden
 Time Trial Championships, Luis León Sánchez
Stage 9 Tour de France, Luis León Sánchez
Stage 6 Danmark Rundt, Theo Bos
Dutch Food Valley Classic, Theo Bos
Overall Tour of Britain, Lars Boom
Stages 3 & 6, Lars Boom

2012 – Rabobank

 Time Trial Championships, Luis León Sánchez
Clásica de Almería, Michael Matthews
Stage 6 Paris–Nice, Luis León Sánchez
Dwars door Drenthe, Theo Bos
Stage 2 Vuelta a Castilla y León, Luis León Sánchez
Stages 1 & 8 Tour of Turkey, Theo Bos
Stage 4 Tour of Turkey, Mark Renshaw
Stages 3 & 4 Tour de Romandie, Luis León Sánchez
Overall  Tour of California, Robert Gesink
Stage 7, Robert Gesink
Stage 3 Ster ZLM Toer, Lars Boom
Stage 14 Tour de France, Luis León Sánchez
Stage 3 Vuelta a Burgos, Matti Breschel
Stage 4 Vuelta a Burgos, Paul Martens
Overall  Eneco Tour, Lars Boom
Stage 3, Theo Bos
Stage 3 Tour of Utah, Michael Matthews
Clásica de San Sebastián, Luis León Sánchez
Dutch Food Valley Classic, Theo Bos
Stage 2 World Ports Classic, Theo Bos
Memorial Rik Van Steenbergen, Theo Bos

2013 – Blanco / Belkin

 Overall  Tour Down Under, Tom-Jelte Slagter
Stage 3, Tom-Jelte Slagter
Stage 2 (ITT) Tour Méditerranéen, Lars Boom
Stage 1 Volta ao Algarve, Paul Martens
Stage 2 Volta ao Algarve, Theo Bos
Stage 2 Tour du Haut Var, Lars Boom
Stages 1 & 2 Tour de Langkawi, Theo Bos
Clásica de Almería, Mark Renshaw
Stage 6 Tour de Langkawi, Tom Leezer
Stage 1 Critérium International, Theo Bos
Stage 3 Tour of Norway, Theo Bos
Stage 5 Tour of Belgium, Luis León Sánchez
Stage 2 Tour de Suisse, Bauke Mollema
 Overall Ster ZLM Toer, Lars Boom
Stage 1 (ITT), Robert Wagner
Stage 2, Theo Bos
Stage 4, Lars Boom
 Overall Tour de Luxembourg, Paul Martens
Overall Danmark Rundt, Wilco Kelderman
Stage 5 (ITT), Wilco Kelderman
Stage 3 Tour de l'Ain, Luis León Sánchez
Stage 1 Eneco Tour, Mark Renshaw
Stage 2 World Ports Classic, Maarten Tjallingii
Stage 17 Vuelta a España, Bauke Mollema
Grand Prix Cycliste de Québec, Robert Gesink
GP Impanis-Van Petegem, Sep Vanmarcke
Münsterland Giro, Jos van Emden
 Overall Tour of Hainan, Moreno Hofland
Stages 1, 6 & 8, Moreno Hofland
Stages 2, 3, 4, 5, 7 & 9, Theo Bos
 National Cyclo-cross championships, Lars Petter Nordhaug

2014 – Belkin

Stage 4 Vuelta a Andalucía, Moreno Hofland
Stages 2, 7, 8 & 9 Tour de Langkawi, Theo Bos
Stage 2 Paris–Nice, Moreno Hofland
Stage 6 Volta a Catalunya, Stef Clement
Volta Limburg Classic, Moreno Hofland
Stage 3 Tour of Norway, Sep Vanmarcke
Stage 4 Tour of Norway, Bauke Mollema
 Overall World Ports Classic, Theo Bos
Stage 5 Tour of Belgium, Paul Martens
Ronde van Zeeland Seaports, Theo Bos
Stage 5 Tour de France, Lars Boom
Stages 1 & 3 Tour of Utah, Moreno Hofland
Stage 3 Tour de Pologne, Theo Bos
 Overall Arctic Race of Norway, Steven Kruijswijk
Stage 1, Lars Petter Nordhaug
Stage 3 Tour of Alberta, Sep Vanmarcke
Stage 4 Tour of Alberta, Theo Bos
Stage 3 Tour de l'Eurometropole, Theo Bos
Stage 1 Tour of Hainan, Moreno Hofland

2015 – LottoNL–Jumbo

Stage 2 Tour de Yorkshire, Moreno Hofland
Stage 3 Ster ZLM Toer, Moreno Hofland
 Time Trial Championship, Wilco Kelderman
Stage 4 (ITT) Eneco Tour, Jos van Emden
Prologue (ITT) Tour de l'Ain, Mike Teunissen
Stage 7 Vuelta a España, Bert-Jan Lindeman

2016 – LottoNL–Jumbo

Stage 3 Volta a la Comunitat Valenciana, Dylan Groenewegen
Stage 1 Driedaagse van West-Vlaanderen, Dylan Groenewegen
Stage 1 Tour de Yorkshire, Dylan Groenewegen
Stage 9 (ITT) Giro d'Italia, Primož Roglič
Heistse Pijl, Dylan Groenewegen
 National Time Trial Championships, Primož Roglič
Rund um Köln, Dylan Groenewegen
Overall Ster ZLM Toer, Sep Vanmarcke
Stage 1 (ITT), Jos van Emden
Stage 3, Dylan Groenewegen
Stage 4, Sep Vanmarcke
 National Time Trial Championships, Victor Campenaerts
 National Road Race Championships, Dylan Groenewegen
Arnhem–Veenendaal Classic, Dylan Groenewegen
Stage 2 Tour du Poitou-Charentes, Tom Van Asbroeck
Stage 14 Vuelta a España, Robert Gesink
Stage 4 Tour of Britain, Dylan Groenewegen
Stage 1 Eneco Tour, Dylan Groenewegen

2017 – LottoNL–Jumbo

Stage 3 (ITT) Vuelta a Andalucía, Victor Campenaerts
 Overall Volta ao Algarve, Primož Roglič
Dwars door West-Vlaanderen, Jos van Emden
Stages 4 & 6 (ITT) Tour of the Basque Country, Primož Roglič
Stage 1 Tour de Yorkshire, Dylan Groenewegen
Stage 5 (ITT) Tour de Romandie, Primož Roglič
Stages 2 & 4 Tour of Norway, Dylan Groenewegen
 Overall Tour of California, George Bennett
Stage 2 Tour des Fjords, Timo Roosen
Stage 21 (ITT) Giro d'Italia, Jos van Emden
Stage 3 Critérium du Dauphiné, Koen Bouwman
Prologue Ster ZLM Toer, Primož Roglič
Stages 2 & 3 Ster ZLM Toer, Dylan Groenewegen
Stage 17 Tour de France, Primož Roglič
Stage 21 Tour de France, Dylan Groenewegen
 Time Trial Championships, Victor Campenaerts 
Stage 1 Tour de l'Ain, Juan José Lobato
Stage 5 BinckBank Tour, Lars Boom

2018 – LottoNL–Jumbo

Stage 1 Volta a la Comunitat Valenciana, Danny van Poppel
Stage 1 Dubai Tour, Dylan Groenewegen
Stages 1 & 4 Volta ao Algarve, Dylan Groenewegen
Kuurne–Brussels–Kuurne, Dylan Groenewegen
Stage 2 Paris–Nice, Dylan Groenewegen
Stage 3 Tirreno–Adriatico, Primož Roglič
Stage 1a Settimana Internazionale di Coppi e Bartali, Pascal Eenkhoorn
 Overall Tour of the Basque Country, Primož Roglič
Stage 4 (ITT), Primož Roglič
 Overall Tour de Romandie, Primož Roglič
Stage 5 Giro d'Italia, Enrico Battaglin 
Stages 1, 3 & 4 Tour of Norway, Dylan Groenewegen
 Overall Tour of Slovenia, Primož Roglič
Stage 2, Dylan Groenewegen
Stages 4 & 5 (ITT), Primož Roglič
Halle–Ingooigem, Danny van Poppel
Stages 7 & 8 Tour de France, Dylan Groenewegen
Stages 19 Tour de France, Primož Roglič
 Overall Tour of Utah, Sepp Kuss
Stages 2, 5 & 6, Sepp Kuss
Stage 3 Colorado Classic, Pascal Eenkhoorn
Arnhem–Veenendaal Classic, Dylan Groenewegen
Stage 5 (TTT) Tour of Britain
Kampioenschap van Vlaanderen, Dylan Groenewegen
Binche–Chimay–Binche, Danny van Poppel
Stage 1 Tour of Guangxi, Dylan Groenewegen

2019 – Team Jumbo–Visma 

Stage 5 Volta a la Comunitat Valenciana, Dylan Groenewegen
Stage 4 Volta ao Algarve, Dylan Groenewegen
 Overall UAE Tour, Primož Roglič
Stage 1 (TTT) 
Stage 6, Primož Roglič
Stages 1 & 2 Paris Nice, Dylan Groenewegen
 Overall Tirreno–Adriatico, Primož Roglič
Three Days of Bruges–De Panne, Dylan Groenewegen
 Overall Tour de Romandie, Primož Roglič
Stages 1, 4 & 5 (ITT), Primož Roglič
Stages 1 (ITT) & 9 (ITT) Giro d'Italia, Primož Roglič
 Overall Four Days of Dunkirk, Mike Teunissen
Stages 1, 2 & 3, Dylan Groenewegen
Stage 5 & 6, Mike Teunissen
Overall Hammer Stavanger
Stage 1
Stages 4 & 5 (ITT) Critérium du Dauphiné, Wout van Aert
Stage 6 Tour de Suisse, Antwan Tolhoek
 Overall ZLM Tour, Mike Teunissen
Prologue, Jos van Emden
Stages 1 & 2, Dylan Groenewegen
Stage 3, Amund Grøndahl Jansen
 National Time Trial Championships, Jos van Emden
 National Time Trial Championships, Wout van Aert
 National Time Trial Championships, Tony Martin
 National Road Race Championships, Amund Grøndahl Jansen
Stage 1 Tour de France, Mike Teunissen
Stage 2 (TTT)  Tour de France
Stage 7 Tour de France, Dylan Groenewegen
Stage 10 Tour de France, Wout van Aert
Stage 6 Tour de Pologne, Jonas Vingegaard
 Overall BinckBank Tour, Laurens De Plus
Stages 1, 3 & 5 Tour of Britain, Dylan Groenewegen
 Overall Vuelta a España, Primož Roglič
 Points classification, Primož Roglič
Stage 10 (ITT), Primož Roglič
Stage 15, Sepp Kuss
Giro dell'Emilia, Primož Roglič
Tre Valli Varesine, Primož Roglič
Tacx Pro Classic, Dylan Groenewegen
Chrono des Nations, Jos van Emden

2020 – Team Jumbo–Visma 

Stages 1 & 3 Volta a la Comunitat Valenciana, Dylan Groenewegen
Stage 4 UAE Tour, Dylan Groenewegen
 National Road Race Championships, Primož Roglič
Strade Bianche, Wout van Aert
Milan–San Remo, Wout van Aert
 Overall Tour de l'Ain, Primož Roglič
Stages 2 & 3, Primož Roglič
Giro del Piemonte, George Bennett
Stage 1 Critérium du Dauphiné, Wout van Aert
Stage 2 Critérium du Dauphiné, Primož Roglič
Stage 5 Critérium du Dauphiné, Sepp Kuss
 National Time Trial Championships, Wout van Aert
Stage 4 Tour de France, Primož Roglič
Stages 5 & 7 Tour de France, Wout van Aert
Liège–Bastogne–Liège, Primož Roglič
 Overall Vuelta a España, Primož Roglič
 Points classification, Primož Roglič
Stages 1, 8, 10 & 13 (ITT), Primož Roglič

2021 – Team Jumbo–Visma 

 National Cyclo-cross Championships, Wout van Aert
 National Road Race Championships, George Bennett
Stage 5 UAE Tour, Jonas Vingegaard
Stages 4, 6 & 7 Paris–Nice, Primož Roglič
Stages 1 & 7 (ITT) Tirreno–Adriatico, Wout van Aert
 Overall Settimana Internazionale di Coppi e Bartali, Jonas Vingegaard
Stages 2 & 4, Jonas Vingegaard
Gent–Wevelgem, Wout van Aert
 Overall Tour of the Basque Country, Primož Roglič
Stage 1 (ITT), Primož Roglič
Amstel Gold Race, Wout van Aert
 National Time Trial Championships, Tom Dumoulin
 National Time Trial Championships, Tobias Foss
 National Time Trial Championships, Tony Martin
 National Road Race Championships, Timo Roosen
 National Road Race Championships, Tobias Foss
 National Road Race Championships, Wout van Aert
Stages 11, 20 (ITT) & 21 Tour de France, Wout van Aert
Stage 15 Tour de France, Sepp Kuss
Stages 1 & 4 Tour de Wallonie, Dylan Groenewegen
 Olympic Time Trial, Primož Roglič
Heistse Pijl, Pascal Eenkhoorn
Stage 1 Danmark Rundt, Dylan Groenewegen
 Overall Vuelta a España, Primož Roglič
Stages 1 (ITT), 11, 17 & 21 (ITT) Primož Roglič
 Overall Tour of Britain, Wout van Aert
Stages 1, 4, 6 & 8, Wout van Aert
Stages 2 & 4 CRO Race, Olav Kooij
Giro dell'Emilia, Primož Roglič
Stage 6 CRO Race, Tim van Dijke
Milano–Torino, Primož Roglič

2022 – Team Jumbo–Visma 

 National Cyclo-cross Championships, Wout van Aert
 National Time Trial Championships, Rohan Dennis
Omloop Het Nieuwsblad, Wout van Aert
La Drôme Classic, Jonas Vingegaard
 Overall Paris–Nice, Primož Roglič
Stage 1, Christophe Laporte
Stage 4 (ITT), Wout van Aert
Stage 7, Primož Roglič
E3 Saxo Bank Classic, Wout van Aert
Stage 1 (ITT) Tour of the Basque Country, Primož Roglič
 Overall Circuit de la Sarthe, Olav Kooij
Stages 2 & 4, Olav Kooij
Stage 1 Tour de Hongrie, Olav Kooij
 Mountains classification Giro d'Italia, Koen Bouwman
Stages 7 & 19, Koen Bouwman 
 Overall Critérium du Dauphiné, Primož Roglič
Stages 1 & 5, Wout van Aert
Stage 8, Jonas Vingegaard
 Overall Ster ZLM Toer, Olav Kooij
Stages 1, 2 & 5, Olav Kooij
 National Time Trial Championships, Tobias Foss
 National Road Race Championships, Pascal Eenkhoorn
Prologue Sibiu Cycling Tour, Tim van Dijke
 Overall Tour de France, Jonas Vingegaard
 Points classification, Wout van Aert
 Mountains classification, Jonas Vingegaard
Stages 4, 8 & 20, Wout van Aert
Stages 11 & 18, Jonas Vingegaard
Stage 19, Christophe Laporte
Stage 1 Tour de Pologne, Olav Kooij
Stage 2 Vuelta a Burgos, Timo Roosen
 Overall Danmark Rundt, Christophe Laporte
Stages 1 & 3, Olav Kooij
Stage 5, Christophe Laporte
Stage 1 (TTT) Vuelta a España
Stage 4 Vuelta a España, Primož Roglič
Bretagne Classic, Wout van Aert
Stage 2 Okolo Slovenska, Archie Ryan
Stage 3 Okolo Slovenska, Koen Bouwman
World Time Trial Championships, Tobias Foss
Stages 3 & 5 CRO Race, Jonas Vingegaard
Münsterland Giro, Olav Kooij
Binche–Chimay–Binche, Christophe Laporte

2023 – Team Jumbo–Visma 

Stage 2 Tour Down Under, Rohan Dennis
 Overall O Gran Camiño, Jonas Vingegaard
Stages 2, 3 & 4 (ITT), Jonas Vingegaard
Omloop Het Nieuwsblad, Dylan van Baarle
Kuurne–Brussels–Kuurne, Tiesj Benoot
Stage 3 (TTT) Paris–Nice
 Overall Tirreno–Adriatico, Primož Roglič
Stage 4, 5 & 6, Primož Roglič
Ronde van Drenthe, Per Strand Hagenes
Stage 1 Volta a Catalunya, Primož Roglič

Supplementary statistics

1984 to 2004

2005 to 2022

2023 to present

Notes

References 

wins
Kwantum
Netherlands sport-related lists